John Frank Stossel (born March 6, 1947) is an American libertarian television presenter, author, consumer journalist, and pundit. He is known for his career as a host on ABC News, Fox Business Network, and Reason TV.

Stossel's style combines reporting and commentary. It reflects a libertarian political philosophy and views on economics which are largely supportive of the free market. He began his journalism career as a researcher for KGW-TV, was a consumer reporter at WCBS-TV in New York City, and then joined ABC News as a consumer editor and reporter on Good Morning America. Stossel became an ABC News correspondent, joining the weekly news magazine program 20/20, and later became a co-anchor. In October 2009, Stossel left ABC News to join the Fox Business Channel. He hosted a weekly news show on Fox Business, Stossel, from December 2009 to December 2016. In 2019, Stossel launched StosselTV, an online channel distributed on social media.

Stossel has received 19 Emmy Awards and five awards from the National Press Club. He has written three books: Give Me a Break in 2004, Myths, Lies, and Downright Stupidity in 2007, and No, They Can't: Why Government Fails – But Individuals Succeed in 2012.

Early life
John F. Stossel was born on March 6, 1947, in Chicago Heights, Illinois, the younger of two sons, to Jewish parents who left Germany before Hitler rose to power. The family joined a Congregationalist church in the U.S., and Stossel was raised Protestant. He grew up on Chicago's affluent North Shore and graduated from New Trier High School. Stossel characterizes his older brother, Thomas P. Stossel, as "the superstar of the family", commenting, "While I partied and played poker, he studied hard, got top grades, and went to Harvard Medical School." Stossel characterizes himself as having been "an indifferent student" while in college, commenting, "I daydreamed through half my classes at Princeton, and applied to grad school only because I was ambitious, and grad school seemed like the right path for a 21-year-old who wanted to get ahead." Although he had been accepted to the University of Chicago's School of Hospital Management, Stossel was "sick of school" and thought taking a job would inspire him to embrace graduate studies with renewed vigor.

Career

Early career
In school, Stossel aspired to work at Seattle Magazine, but it went out of business by the time he graduated. His contacts there assisted him in getting a job at KGW-TV in Portland, Oregon, where Stossel began as a newsroom gofer, working his way up to researcher and then writer. After a few years, the news director told Stossel to go on the air and read what he wrote. Despite his stage fright, Stossel says his fear spurred him to improve, examining and imitating broadcasts of David Brinkley and Jack Perkins. Stossel had also stuttered since childhood. After a few years of on-air reporting, Stossel was hired by WCBS-TV in New York City, by Ed Joyce, the same news director who hired Arnold Diaz, Linda Ellerbee, Dave Marash, Joel Siegel and Lynn Sherr. Stossel was disappointed at CBS, feeling that the more limited amount of time spent there on research lowered the quality of its journalism compared to Portland. Stossel cites union work rules that discouraged the extra work that Stossel felt allowed employees to be creative, which he says represented his "first real introduction to the deals made by special interests". Stossel also "hated" Joyce, who he felt was "cold and critical", though Stossel credits Joyce with allowing him the freedom to pursue his own story ideas, and with recommending the Hollins Communications Research Institute in Roanoke, Virginia, that helped Stossel manage his stutter.

Stossel grew continuously more frustrated with having to follow the assignment editor's vision of what was news. Perhaps because of his stuttering, he had always avoided covering what others covered, feeling he could not succeed if he were forced to compete with other reporters by shouting out questions at news conferences. However, this led to the unexpected realization for Stossel that more important events were those that occurred slowly, such as the women's movement, the growth of computer technology, and advancements in contraception, rather than daily events like government pronouncements, elections, fires, or crime. One day, Stossel bypassed the assignment editor to give Ed Joyce a list of story ideas the assignment editor had rejected. Joyce agreed that Stossel's ideas were better, and approved them. Stossel has served as a spokesman for the Stuttering Foundation of America.

20/20
In 1981 Roone Arledge offered Stossel a job at ABC News, as a correspondent for 20/20 and consumer reporter for Good Morning America. His "Give Me a Break" segments for the former featured a skeptical look at subjects from government regulations and pop culture to censorship and unfounded fear. The series was spun off into a series of one-hour specials with budgets of half a million dollars that began in 1994. During the course of his work on 20/20, Stossel discovered Reason magazine, and found that the libertarian ideas of its writers made sense to him. Stossel was named co-anchor of 20/20 in May 2003, while he was writing his first book, Give Me a Break: How I Exposed Hucksters, Cheats, and Scam Artists and Became the Scourge of the Liberal Media, which was published in 2004. In it, he details his start in journalism and consumer reporting, and how he evolved to harbor libertarian beliefs.

Fox News Channel and Fox Business Network

In September 2009, it was announced that Stossel was leaving Disney's ABC News and joining News Corp.'s Fox News Channel and Fox Business Network. In addition to appearing on The O'Reilly Factor every Tuesday night, he also hosted a one-hour weekly program for Fox Business Network and a series of one-hour specials for Fox News Channel, as well as making regular guest appearances on Fox News programs.

The program, Stossel, debuted December 10, 2009, on Fox Business Network. The program examined issues related to individual freedom, free market capitalism and small government, such as civil liberties, the business of health care, and free trade. The final episode premiered on December 16, 2016. At the end of that episode, a retrospective that spotlighted moments from seven years of the program, Stossel explained that due to his age, he wanted to help develop a younger generation of journalists with his views, and would continue to appear as a guest on Fox programs, and also help produce content for Reason TV. His blog, "Stossel's Take", is published on both FoxBusiness.com and FoxNews.com.

Stossel TV 
In 2019, Stossel launched Stossel TV, an online channel which distributes weekly videos via social media platforms. Videos challenge assumptions about the effectiveness of government regulations and programs, illustrate how free markets help people live better lives, and teach the principles and benefits of a free society.

Publications

Stossel has written three books. Give Me a Break: How I Exposed Hucksters, Cheats, and Scam Artists and Became the Scourge of the Liberal Media is a 2005 autobiography from Harper Perennial documenting his career and philosophical transition from liberalism to libertarianism. It describes his opposition to government regulation, his belief in free market and private enterprise, support for tort reform, and advocacy for shifting social services from the government to private charities. It was a New York Times bestseller for 11 weeks. Myths, Lies, and Downright Stupidity: Get Out the Shovel – Why Everything You Know Is Wrong, which was published in 2007 by Hyperion, questions the validity of various conventional wisdoms, and argues that the belief he is conservative is untrue. On April 10, 2012, Threshold Editions, an imprint of Simon & Schuster, published Stossel's third book No, They Can't: Why Government Fails – But Individuals Succeed. It argues that government policies meant to solve problems instead produce new ones, and that free individuals and the private sector perform tasks more efficiently than the government does.

With financial support from the libertarian Palmer R. Chitester Fund, Stossel and ABC News launched a series of educational materials for public schools in 1999 entitled "Stossel in the Classroom". It was taken over in 2006 by the Center for Independent Thought and releases a new DVD of teaching materials annually. In 2006, Stossel and ABC released Teaching Tools for Economics, a video series based on the National Council of Economics Education standards.

Since February 2011, Stossel has written a weekly newspaper column for Creators Syndicate. His articles appear in such online publications as Newsmax, Reason, and Townhall.

Political positions
Stossel purports to debunk myths in his journalism. His Myths and Lies series of 20/20 specials challenges a range of liberal beliefs. He also hosted The Power of Belief (October 6, 1998), an ABC News Special that focused on assertions of the paranormal and people's desire to believe. Another report put forward the argument that opposition to DDT is misplaced and that the ban on DDT has resulted in the deaths of millions of children, mostly in poor nations.

Libertarianism

As a libertarian, Stossel says that he believes in both personal freedom and the free market. He frequently uses television airtime to advance these views and challenge viewers' distrust of free-market capitalism and economic competition. He received an Honoris Causa Doctorate from Francisco Marroquin University, a libertarian university in Guatemala, in 2008.

Stossel argues that individual self-interest, or "greed", creates an incentive to work harder and to innovate. He argues that this innovation makes the poor richer and the only way people "can get rich is to offer us something that we believe is better than we had before." He promoted school choice as a way to improve American public schools akin to the Belgian voucher system.

Stossel has criticized government programs for being inefficient, wasteful, and harmful. He has also criticized the American legal system, opining that it provides lawyers and vexatious litigators the incentive to file frivolous lawsuits indiscriminately. Although Stossel concedes that some lawsuits are necessary in order to provide justice to people genuinely injured by others with greater economic power, he advocates the adoption in the U.S. of the English rule as one method to reduce the more abusive or frivolous lawsuits.

Stossel opposes the minimum wage, corporate welfare, bailouts and the war in Iraq. He also opposes legal prohibitions against pornography, marijuana, recreational drugs, gambling, ticket scalping, prostitution, polygamy, and assisted suicide, and believes most abortions should be legal. He supports gun rights, and advocates lower and simpler taxes, endorsing or exploring various ideas in his specials and on his TV series for changing the tax system, including switching to a flat tax, and replacing the income tax with the FairTax.

When the Department of Labor reissued federal guidelines in April 2010 governing the employment of unpaid interns under the Fair Labor Standards Act based on a 1947 Supreme Court decision, Stossel criticized the guidelines, appearing in a police uniform during an appearance on the Fox News program America Live, commenting, "I've built my career on unpaid interns, and the interns told me it was great – I learned more from you than I did in college." Asked why he did not pay them if they were so valuable, he said he could not afford to.

Stossel is a faculty member of the Charles Koch Institute.

Stossel has advocated in favor of abolishing the Food and Drug Administration (FDA).

On April 1, 2016, Stossel moderated the first-ever nationally televised Libertarian presidential debate. The second part of the debate aired on April 8. On May 21, 2020, he moderated the Libertarian Party National Convention Presidential Debate between Jacob Hornberger, Vermin Supreme, Jo Jorgensen, Jim Gray, and John Monds.

Science 
In 2001, the progressive media watchdog organization FAIR criticized Stossel's reportage of global warming in his documentary, Tampering with Nature, for using "highly selective...information" that placed undue emphasis on three dissenters from among the 2,000 members of the UN's Intergovernmental Panel on Climate Change, which had recently released a report stating that global temperatures were rising almost twice as fast as previously thought.

In December 2014, Stossel stated that "There is no good data showing secondhand smoke kills people." The fact-checker website Politifact rated this statement "False", citing considerable levels of scientific research showing that secondhand smoke has caused deaths.

Praise and criticism

Awards
As of 2001, Stossel had won 19 Emmy Awards. He was honored five times for excellence in consumer reporting by the National Press Club, has received a George Polk Award for Outstanding Local Reporting and a Peabody Award. On April 23, 2012, Stossel was awarded the Chapman University Presidential Medal, by the current president, James Doti, and chancellor, Danielle Struppa. The award has been presented to only a handful of people over the past 150 years. Stossel received an honorary doctorate from Universidad Francisco Marroquín.

Praise
The Nobel Prize–winning Chicago School monetarist economist Milton Friedman lauded Stossel, stating: "Stossel is that rare creature, a TV commentator who understands economics, in all its subtlety." Steve Forbes, the editor of Forbes magazine, described Stossel as riveting and "one of America's ablest and most courageous journalists." P. J. O'Rourke, best-selling author of Eat the Rich and Parliament of Whores praised Stossel, stating: 
An article published by the libertarian group Advocates for Self Government notes praise for Stossel. Independent Institute Research Analyst Anthony Gregory, writing on the libertarian blog, LewRockwell.com, described Stossel as a "heroic rogue... a media maverick and proponent of freedom in an otherwise statist, conformist mass media." Libertarian investment analyst Mark Skousen said Stossel is "a true libertarian hero".

Criticism and controversy
Progressive organizations such as Fairness and Accuracy In Reporting (FAIR) and Media Matters for America (MMfA) have criticized Stossel's work, for what they described as a lack of balance of coverage and distortion of facts on his part. For example, Stossel was criticized for a segment on his October 11, 1999, show during which he argued that AIDS research has received too much funding, "25 times more than on Parkinson's, which kills more people." FAIR pointed out that AIDS had in fact killed more people in the United States in 1999.

In a February 2000 Salon feature on Stossel titled "Prime-time propagandist", David Mastio wrote that Stossel has a conflict of interest in donating profits from his public speaking engagements to, among others, a non-profit called "Stossel in the Classroom" which includes material for use in schools, some of which uses material made by Stossel.

University of Texas economist James K. Galbraith has alleged that Stossel, in his September 1999 special Is America #1?, used an out-of-context clip of Galbraith to convey the notion that Galbraith advocated the adoption by Europe of the free market economics practiced by the United States, when in fact Galbraith actually advocated that Europe adopt some of the United States' social benefit transfer mechanisms such as Social Security, which is the economically opposite view. Stossel denied any misrepresentation of Galbraith's views and stated that it was not his intention to convey that Galbraith agreed with all of the special's ideas. However, he re-edited that portion of the program for its September 2000 repeat, in which Stossel paraphrased, "Even economists who like Europe's policies, like James Galbraith, now acknowledge America's success."

David Schultz incident
On December 28, 1984, during an interview for 20/20 on professional wrestling, wrestler David Schultz struck Stossel twice after Stossel said professional wrestling was "fake". Stossel said he suffered from pain and buzzing in his ears eight weeks after the assault. Stossel sued and obtained a settlement of $280,000 from the World Wrestling Federation (WWF). In his book, Myths, Lies, and Downright Stupidity, Stossel noted his regret, believing lawsuits harm innocent people. Schultz maintains that he attacked Stossel on orders from Vince McMahon, the head of the then-WWF. This was later re-visited on the second season episode of Dark Side of the Ring, aired on April 28, 2020.

Organic vegetables
A February 2000 story about organic vegetables on 20/20 included statements by Stossel that tests had shown that neither organic nor conventional produce samples contained any pesticide residue, and that organic food was more likely to be contaminated by E. coli bacteria. The Environmental Working Group objected to his report, mainly questioning his statements about bacteria, but also managed to determine that the produce had never been tested for pesticides. They communicated this to Stossel, but after the story's producer backed Stossel's statement that the test results had been as described, the story was rebroadcast months later, unchanged, and with a postscript in which Stossel reiterated his claim. Later, after a report in The New York Times confirmed the Environmental Working Group's claims, ABC News suspended the producer of the segment for a month and reprimanded Stossel. Stossel apologized, saying that he had thought the tests had been conducted as reported. However, he asserted that the gist of his report had been accurate.

Frederick K. C. Price
In a March 2007 segment about finances and lifestyles of televangelists, 20/20 aired a segment by Stossel that included a clip of television minister Frederick K. C. Price, which had originally been broadcast by the Lifetime Network in 1997. Price alleged that the clip portrayed him describing his wealth in extravagant terms, when he was actually telling a parable about a rich man. ABC News twice aired a retraction and apologized for the error. The suit concluded with an out of court settlement including a public apology by ABC.

Lawsuit against fact-checkers 
In September 2021, Stossel sued Facebook over libel issues, after fact checkers, including Science Feedback and Climate Feedback, labeled Stossel's video titled "Government Fueled Fires" as "misleading" and labeled another video titled "Are We Doomed?" as "partly false" and "factual inaccuracies". Stossel stated that the "misleading label" caused immediate harm to his viewership, advertisement revenue, and reputation and that Facebook and its fact checking partners "falsely attributed to Stossel a claim he never made, and on that basis flagged the content as 'misleading' and 'missing context,' so that would-be viewers would be routed to the false attribution statement." In the first video, Stossel argued that "while climate change undoubtedly contributes to forest fires, it was not the primary cause of the 2020 California fires", instead primarily blaming government mismanagement of forests. In the second video, Stossel questioned statements made by those he refers to as "environmental alarmists", including "claims that hurricanes are getting stronger, that sea level rise poses a catastrophic threat, and that humans will be unable to cope with the fallout." In response, a Facebook spokesperson stated: "We believe this case is without merit and we will defend ourselves vigorously against the allegations." In December 2021, Facebook attorneys responded to Stossel's lawsuit, saying that "The labels themselves are neither false nor defamatory; to the contrary, they constitute protected opinion." In October 2022, the federal court ruled against Stossel, granting Facebook's motion to dismiss and anti-SLAPP motion (which requires Stossel to reimburse Facebook's attorneys fees).

Personal life
Stossel lives in New York City with his wife, Ellen Abrams and children, Lauren and Max. They also own a home in Massachusetts.

Stossel came to embrace his family's Ashkenazi Jewish heritage after marrying his wife, who is also Jewish. They also raised their children Jewish. Stossel identified himself as an agnostic in "Skeptic or Believer", the December 16, 2010 episode of Stossel, explaining that he had no belief in God but was open to the possibility.

Stossel's brother, Thomas P. Stossel, was a Harvard Medical School professor and co-director of the Hematology Division at Boston's Brigham and Women's Hospital. He has served on the advisory boards of pharmaceutical companies such as Merck and Pfizer. Stossel's nephew is journalist and magazine editor Scott Stossel.

On April 20, 2016, Stossel announced he had lung cancer despite never having smoked, and that as a result of its early detection, he would have a fifth of one of his lungs surgically removed.

Books

See also
 List of newspaper columnists

References

External links

 
 
 
Stossel TV YouTube Channel

Biographies and articles about Stossel
 ABC News Biography
 Johnson, Peter. "Stossel's evolution from activist to contrarian angers some of his fans", USA Today, April 30, 2006
 Sullum, Jacob. "Risky Journalism: ABC's John Stossel bucks a fearful establishment" Reason, April 1997.

Articles by Stossel
 John Stossel's 20/20 Web Page
 John Stossel's Newspaper Columns
 John Stossel's Column on Creators.com

1947 births
Living people
ABC News personalities
American agnostics
American columnists
American former Protestants
American libertarians
American people of German-Jewish descent
American political commentators
American skeptics
Emmy Award winners
Fox Business people
Fox News people
George Polk Award recipients
Jewish agnostics
New Trier High School alumni
Peabody Award winners
Princeton University alumni
Television anchors from Portland, Oregon